Salih Fırat (born 1 January 1960) is a Turkish politician of Kurdish origin from the Justice and Development Party (AKP), who has served as a Member of Parliament for Adıyaman since 12 June 2011.

Early life and career
Born in Adıyaman, he graduated from Ankara University Faculty of Medicine and worked in hospitals in Izmir, Ordu and Adıyaman as an expert on orthopedics and traumatology. He was also a member of the Adıyaman Sports Club executive board and was the club's doctor. He is a member of the Human Rights Foundation.

Political career
First elected as a CHP Member of Parliament in the 2011 general election, he resigned from the CHP and joined the AKP in 2013 after accusing CHP politicians of making racist remarks against Kurds. He was re-elected as an MP, this time from the AKP party list, in the June 2015 general election.

See also
24th Parliament of Turkey
25th Parliament of Turkey

References

External links
MP profile on the Grand National Assembly website
 Collection of all relevant news items at Haberler.com

Justice and Development Party (Turkey) politicians
Republican People's Party (Turkey) politicians
Deputies of Adıyaman
Turkish Kurdish people
Living people
People from Adıyaman
Ankara University alumni
Turkish orthopedic surgeons
1960 births
Members of the 25th Parliament of Turkey
Members of the 24th Parliament of Turkey
Members of the 26th Parliament of Turkey
Turkish sports physicians